MIDAS is a data acquisition package developed at the Paul Scherrer Institute, Switzerland, and TRIUMF, Canada. It was designed for particle detectors using CAMAC and VMEbus hardware.

Description 
MIDAS (Maximum Integration Data Acquisition System) has been developed as a general purpose data acquisition system for small and medium scale experiments originally by Stefan Ritt in 1993, followed by Pierre-André Amaudruz in 1996. It is written in C and published under the GPL.

The experiment complexity ranges from test systems, where a single PC is connected to CAMAC via a PC-CAMAC interface, to experiments with several front-end computers and analysis nodes. The system currently runs under Linux, Microsoft Windows, various versions of UNIX, VMS, VxWorks and MS-DOS and can be ported easily to virtually any operating system which supports TCP/IP sockets.

A speed-optimized RPC layer is used for data exchange, with which sustained data rates of 980 kB/s (10BASE-T), 8.7 MB/s (100BASE-TX) and up to 98 MB/s (1000BASE-T). An integrated slow control system contains a fast online database and a history system. Drivers exist for CAMAC, VME, Fastbus, High Voltage Crates, GBIB and several PC plug-in DAQ boards. A framework is supplied which can be extended by user code for front-end readout on one side and data analysis on the other side. The online data can be presented by PAW as histograms and N-tuples as well as by ROOT. A dedicated HTTP server gives fast Web access for experiment control and to access the slow control system including a graphical representation of variable trends (history display).

Usage of MIDAS 
MIDAS is used in many experiments in nuclear and particle physics. Following list shows a few of them:

 Mu to E Gamma experiment at PSI
 Mu3e experiment at PSI
 Laboratory for Muon Spin Spectroscopy at PSI
 TWIST experiment at TRIUMF
 Various ISAC experiments at TRIUMF
 T2K experiment in Japan
 DEAP-3600 experiment at SNOLAB
 Muon g-2 experiment at Fermilab
 ASACUSA experiment at CERN
 ALPHA experiment at CERN

References

External links 
 MIDAS home page at TRIUMF, Canada

Physics software